John Charlton (fl. early 1400s) was the member of Parliament for Malmesbury for the parliaments of 1406, April 1414, and 1420.

References 

Members of the Parliament of England for Malmesbury
English MPs 1406
Year of birth unknown
Year of death unknown
English MPs April 1414
English MPs 1420